In construction, a nogging or nogging piece (England and Australia), dwang (Scotland, South Island, New Zealand, and lower/central North Island, New Zealand), blocking (North America), noggin (Australia and Greater Auckland Region of New Zealand), or nogs (New Zealand and Australia), is a horizontal bracing piece used between wall studs or floor joists to give rigidity to the wall or floor frames of a building. Noggings may be made of timber, steel, or aluminium. If made of timber they are cut slightly longer than the space they fit into, and are driven into place so they fit tightly or are rabbeted into the wall stud. Timber noggings are fixed to the perimeter, abutments, or for the purpose of framing any openings using suitable fixings.

The interval between noggings is dictated by local building codes and by the type of timber used; a typical timber-framed house in a non-cyclonic area will have two or three noggings per storey between each pair of neighbouring studs.  Additional noggings may be added as grounds for later fixings.

Noggings between vertical studs generally brace the studs against buckling under load; noggings on floor joists prevent the joists from twisting or rotating under load (lateral-torsional buckling), and are often fixed at intervals, in pairs diagonally for that reason.  In floors this type of bracing is also called herringbone strutting. It is also used in ceilings to prevent not only joist twisting but also ceiling damage.

Noggings provide no bracing effect in shear and are generally supplemented by diagonal bracing to prevent the frame from racking.

References

See also
 Blocking (construction)
Carpentry

Building engineering
Structural system
Carpentry